Minuscule 358 (in the Gregory-Aland numbering), ε 148 (Soden), is a Greek minuscule manuscript of the New Testament, on parchment. Paleographically it has been assigned to the 14th century. 
It is known as Codex Mutinensis II. It has full marginalia

Description 

The codex contains a complete text of the four Gospels on 203 parchment leaves. It is written in one column per page, in 21 lines per page.

There is also a division according to the Ammonian Sections (in Mark 233 Sections - last in 16:8), with references to the Eusebian Canons.

Lectionary markings at the margin and incipits were added by a later hand.

Text 

The Greek text of the codex is a representative of the Byzantine text-type. Aland placed it in Category V.
According to the Claremont Profile Method it belongs to the textual family Kx in Luke 1, Luke 10, and Luke 20. It creates pair with Minuscule 360.

History 

The manuscript was added to the list of New Testament manuscripts by Scholz (1794–1852). 
It was examined by Burgon. C. R. Gregory saw it in 1886.

The manuscript is currently housed at the Biblioteca Estense (G. 9, a.U.2.3 (II A 9)) in Modena.

See also 

 List of New Testament minuscules
 Biblical manuscript
 Textual criticism

References

Further reading 

 

Greek New Testament minuscules
14th-century biblical manuscripts
Biblioteca Estense